The Provost is the chairman of the Governing Body of Eton College. He is chosen by the Crown and is assisted by a Vice-Provost and ten Fellows.

Provosts of Eton

15th century

Henry Sever (1440–1442)
William Waynflete (1442–1447)
John Clerk (1447)
William Westbury (1447)Thomas Barker (1447)

16th century

Henry Bost (1477–1504)
Roger Lupton (1504–1535)
Roger Aldrich (1535–1547)
Sir Thomas Smith (1547–1554)
Henry Cole (1554–1559)
William Bill (1559–1561)Richard Bruerne (1561)
William Day (1561–1596)

17th century

Sir Henry Savile (1596–1622)
Sir Thomas Murray (1622–1623)
Sir Henry Wotton (1624–1639)
Richard Steward (1639–1644)
Francis Rous (1644–1659)
Nicholas Lockyer (1659–1660)
Nicholas Monck (1660–1661)
John Meredith (1662–1665)
Richard Allestree (1665–1680)
Zachary Cradock (1681–1695)

18th century

Henry Godolphin (1695–1732)
Henry Bland (1733–1746)
Stephen Sleech (1746–1765)
Edward Barnard (1765–1781)
William Hayward Roberts (1781–1791)

19th century

Jonathan Davies (1791–1809)
Joseph Goodall (1809–1840)John Lonsdale (1840)
Francis Hodgson (1840–1853)
Edward Craven Hawtrey (1853–1862)
Charles Old Goodford (1862–1884)

20th century

James John Hornby (1884–1909)
Edmond Warre (1909–1918)
Montague Rhodes James (1918–1936)
Hugh Cecil, 1st Baron Quickswood (1936–1944)
Sir Henry Marten (1945–1949)
Sir Claude Aurelius Elliott (1949–1965)
Harold Caccia, Baron Caccia (1965–1978)
Martin Charteris, Baron Charteris of Amisfield (1978–1991)
Sir Antony Acland (1991–2000)

21st century

Sir Eric Anderson (2000–2009)
William Waldegrave, Baron Waldegrave of North Hill (2009–present)

Notes

See also
List of Head Masters of Eton College

Sources

Provosts of Eton
 
Eton College